The following is a list of California locations by crime rate.

In 2014, California reported 153,709 violent crimes (3.96 for every 1,000 people) and 947,192 property crimes (24.41 for every 1,000 people). These rates are very similar for the average county and city in California.

Entire state – 2014
The following table includes the number of incidents reported and the rate per 1,000 persons for each type of offense.

Counties

Cities and other agencies 

There's hardly any correlation between crime rates and population or population density whatsoever for cities in California.

The median city had crime rates slightly lower than that of the state, with a violent crime rate of 2.74 and a property crime rate of 21.66. The fact that the average city had crime rates similar to the state in contrast to the lower median rates indicates the presence of outliers with high crime rates. Indeed, the 66th percentile for violent crime rates was 3.69 crimes per 1,000 people, still not as high as the average crime rate among cities (the 33rd percentile was 1.81).

Irvine ranks second with regard to lowest violent crime rates among places with a population of 50,000 or more even though it has a population roughly five times that. Its violent crime rate is 0.49 per 1,000 people. Joining Irvine among the top five in that population class are San Ramon (0.31), Murrieta (0.63), Cupertino (0.66), and Yorba Linda (0.66). Change the focus to property crime and Orange County cities with a population not much higher than 50,000 dominate the top ten, with seven of the ten places ranking in the top ten being located in Orange County, including (in ascending order of violent crime rate) Aliso Viejo, Laguna Niguel, Lake Forest, Mission Viejo, and Yorba Linda.

Of the ten places with populations over 50,000 and the highest violent crime rates, only two had populations under 100,000: they are Santa Cruz (8.26) and Compton (11.49). The other places include (in descending order of violent crime rate) Oakland, Stockton, San Bernardino, Vallejo, and San Francisco.

See also 
 Crime in California
 California locations by income
 California locations by race
 California locations by voter registration
 Organized crime in California
 Crime in the United States

Notes

References 

Crime in California